The Shadows of That Night is a 1922 German silent film directed by Fred Sauer and starring Hans Adalbert Schlettow, Hans Adalbert Schlettow, Hilde Wolter and Hermann Picha.

The film's sets were designed by the art director Franz Schroedter.

Cast
 Hans Adalbert Schlettow as George Green
 Hilde Wolter as Daisy Plunkett
 Hermann Picha as Lahme Jonny
 Adele Hartwig as Alte Kelly
 C.W. Tetting as James Brown
 Hugo Fischer-Köppe

References

External links

1922 films
Films of the Weimar Republic
German silent feature films
Films directed by Fred Sauer
German black-and-white films
1920s German films